The New Hampshire College & University Council (NHCUC) is a non-profit association of public and private colleges and universities located in the U.S. state of New Hampshire. Established in 1966, the NHCUC coordinates collaborative initiatives among its member schools, sponsors professional development conferences for faculty and administrators, promotes greater awareness to the general public of higher education opportunities in the state, and provides a discussion forum for administrators of its member schools. The NHCUC also manages Visit NH Colleges, an online information resource for high school students and guidance counselors.

The NHCUC also collaborates on an initiative to help retain New Hampshire's younger workforce by connecting college students to job opportunities within the state. This is part of a statewide effort to encourage students to live and work in New Hampshire after graduation.

Members
The NHCUC consists of the following schools:
Antioch University New England
Colby-Sawyer College
Community College System of New Hampshire
Franklin Pierce University
Granite State College
Hellenic American University
Keene State College
MCPHS University (Manchester, NH campus)
New England College
New Hampshire Institute of Art
Plymouth State University
Rivier University
Saint Anselm College
Southern New Hampshire University
University of New Hampshire

See also
List of colleges and universities in New Hampshire

References

External links
 New Hampshire College & University Council

College and university associations and consortia in the United States
Universities and colleges in New Hampshire
Organizations established in 1966
1966 establishments in New Hampshire